The International Academy for Production Engineering (CIRP) is a professional body for research into production engineering. CIRP comes from the French acronym of College International pour la Recherche en Productique (CIRP).

CIRP was founded in 1951 as the International Institution for Production Engineering Research.

CIRP uses different platforms for scientific exchange. One of this is "CIRP Global Web Conference on Production Engineering Research" born in 2011.
The CSI of Naples University, Ing Fabrizio Pietrafesa provided technical support for multimedial contents
in 2014.

References

Further reading
Remmerswaal, Joost L. (Ed.) (1991) Forty years of CIRP : the history of the International Institution for Production Engineering Research, 1951-1991. International Academy for Production Engineering.

External links 
https://www.cirp.net/

Organizations based in Paris
1951 establishments in France
Engineering organizations
Learned societies of France